Annelisa Dora Deborah Weiland (born 15 February 1949) is a South African actress and writer. She is known for her roles in the films Meerkat Maantuig, Die Sonvreter, Wild Maneuvres as well as her long-running role on the SABC2 soap opera 7de Laan.

Early life
Weiland was born in Sea Point, Cape Town to parents Ewald Paul Weiland and Stienie Hoogenhout Goosen and grew up in Durbanville. Her father had arrived in South Africa from Bielefeld, Germany at the age of 22 to help install textile machinery. Weiland attended Hoërskool Durbanville, matriculating in 1966, before going on to graduate with a degree in theatre from the University of Cape Town.

Career
In 1969, Weiland made her debut film The Father. In 1970, she appeared in Dieter Reible's theatre version of Titus Andronicus and then Ophelia in a production of Hamlet produced by Robert Mohr.

In 1971, Weiland was nominated for Best Supporting Actress for her role in Titus Andronicus at the Three Leaf Awards. In 1973, she started acting for PACT. In 1974, she became a permanent member of PACT Afrikaans company TRUK. She continued to work with them until 1977. In 1978, she won the Artes Award for Best Actress for her role in the film Die Koster. In 1993, she won the DALRO Award for Best Supporting Actress on the Afrikaans stage for Mirakel. 

In 2000, she made her television debut as Hilda de Kock in the soap opera 7de Laan. She continued to play the role for 19 consecutive years until her retirement in 2019. In 2014, she won the Tempo Award for Best Soap Actress of the Year for her role in 7de Laan.

Weiland has done voiceover and translation work. On television, she has also appeared as Paddy van Heerden in Die Vierde Kabinet, Cornelia in Elke Skewe Pot, Annetjie in Lui Maar Op, Belinda, Meemee in Mense Mense, Katharina Vosloo in Suidooster and Priscilla in Triptiek.

Personal life
Weiland had a seven-year relationship with director Ken Leach.

Filmography

References

External links
 

Living people
1949 births
Actresses from Cape Town
South African people of German descent